The Ahrar Party ("Liberal Party") was a small political party in the Azerbaijan Democratic Republic (1918–1920), representing mainly the Sunni peasantry of Azerbaijan. It had five members in the Azerbaijani Parliament of 1918, and one minister in the fourth cabinet. It was dissolved after Soviet invasion of Azerbaijan in 1920.

Members of Parliament
 Aslan bey Gardashov
 Haji Molla Ahmad Nuruzadeh
 Mukhtar Afandizadeh
 Garib Karimoglu
 Bayram Niyazi Kichikkhanly

Minister
 Aslan bey Gardashov, Minister of Agriculture

See also
 Azerbaijan Democratic Republic
 Musavat
 Ittihad

References

Defunct political parties in Azerbaijan
Pre-1920 political parties in Azerbaijan
Political parties of the Russian Revolution